Misheck Chidzambwa (nee Marimo; 1954/1955 – 24 June 2021) was a Zimbabwean football player and manager.

Early and personal life
His older brother Sunday was also a footballer. Their original surname was Marimo.

Playing career
Chidzambwa played as a defender for Dynamos. He served as captain of the national team, captaining them to the Cecafa Senior Challenge Cup in 1985. He combined his football career with working for the police. He retired in 1987 due to injury.

Coaching career
Chidzambwa was on Clemens Westerhof's coaching staff when he was manager of the Zimbabwe national team. He succeeded Westerhof as manager in 2000, winning the Cosafa Cup. He also managed club sides Tanganda, Chapungu United, Sporting Lions and Blue Ribbon. With Tanganda he won the Castle Cup in 1993. He was fired by Blue Ribbon in 2011, and left football. In February 2017 he said he wanted to return to football. Later that year he returned to coaching at Universals, also occasionally playing for the club.

Later life and death
He died on 24 June 2021, aged 66. He had been unwell since May 2020.

References

1950s births
2021 deaths
Zimbabwean footballers
Zimbabwe international footballers
Dynamos F.C. players
Association football defenders
Zimbabwean football managers
Zimbabwe national football team managers